Candida stellata is a species of yeast of the genus Candida. The year of 1978 saw work of Yarrow & Meyer the yeast was reclassified to its current name from Saccharomyces stellatus, which was initially described by Kroemer and Krumbholz in 1931.

References

Yeasts
stellata